Tiquinho is a nickname. It may refer to:

 Tiquinho (footballer, born 1985), Fábio André da Silva Ferraz, Angolan football winger
 Tiquinho Soares (born 1991), Francisco das Chagas Soares dos Santos, Portuguese football forward
 Tiquinho (footballer, born 1995), Erikson Carlos Batista dos Santos, Brazilian football forward

See also
 Toquinho (born 1946), Antônio Pecci Filho, Brazilian singer and guitarist